Lust for Love is a 1967 West German drama film directed by Edgar Reitz, starring Heidi Stroh and Georg Hauke. It tells the story of the marriage and subsequent crisis of a young female photographer and a medical student. It was the director's first fiction film.

The film premiered in West Germany on 21 March 1967. It was shown in competition at the 28th Venice International Film Festival, where it won the award for Best First Work.

Cast

References

External links 
 

1967 films
1967 drama films
Films directed by Edgar Reitz
German drama films
1960s German-language films
West German films
1960s German films